Thyroid stimulating hormone, beta also known as TSHB is a protein which in humans is encoded by the TSHB gene.

Function 

Thyrotropin-stimulating hormone (TSH) is a noncovalently linked glycoprotein heterodimer and is part of a family of pituitary hormones containing a common alpha subunit (TSHA) and a unique beta subunit (this protein) that confers specificity.

See also
 thyroid stimulating hormone

References

Further reading